Unbroken is an album by saxophonist Buddy Tate's Celebrity Club Orchestra which was recorded in Germany in 1970 and released on the MPS label.

Reception

Scott Yanow of AllMusic states, "The enjoyable music swings hard, making one wish that this fine session were reissued".

Track listing
 "Undecided" (Sid Robin, Charlie Shavers) – 4:09
 "Moten Swing" (Buster Moten, Bennie Moten) – 6:59
 "Candy" (Alex Kramer, Mack David, Joan Whitney) – 5:13
 "Ben's Broken Saxophone" (Ben Richardson) – 3:57
 "Air Mail Special" (Benny Goodman, James Mundy, Charlie Christian) – 4:13
 "Body and Soul" (Johnny Green, Edward Heyman, Robert Sour, Frank Eyton) – 4:35
 "Tuxedo Junction" (Erskine Hawkins, Bill Johnson, Julian Dash) – 4:53
 "One for Johnny" (Nat Pierce) – 6:33

Personnel
Buddy Tate – tenor saxophone
Dud Bascomb – trumpet
Eli Robinson – trombone
Ben Richardson – clarinet, alto saxophone, baritone saxophone
Nat Pierce – piano
Eddie Jones – bass
George Reed – drums

References

Buddy Tate albums
1970 albums
MPS Records albums